The 2018–19 season is the 74th Crvena zvezda season in the existence of the club. The team played in the Basketball League of Serbia, in the Adriatic League and in the EuroCup.

Crvena zvezda won their first Adriatic Supercup trophy, the fourth Adriatic League Championship, and the 20th National Championship.

Overview 
In summer 2018 the team started with signing Milan Tomić as a head coach. Soon to follow were the players Billy Baron, Michael Ojo and two centers from Radonjić era: Maik Zirbes and Dušan Ristić. Zvezda also added experienced Stratos Perperoglou and Mouhammad Faye, as well as point guard Joe Ragland. The last one to sign was combo guard Nemanja Nenadić from development team FMP.

After the end of the 2017–18 season, Stefan Janković decided to part ways with Crvena zvezda even though he was under contract with them, with both parties having different views on his contract status. His contract status was since then under review by the Basketball Federation of Serbia and FIBA.

Crvena zvezda started the season well, convincingly winning ABA Super Cup tournament by beating last season ABA champion Budućnost in the final game. Tomić struck a great balance between hard defense and versatile offense, causing team to grab the first spot at the beginning of ABA League, as well as the EuroCup Group A. Bad streak in EuroCup during November caused the Zvezda to finish group phase on the third spot, which was still good enough for it to advance to the next stage. In ABA, Zvezda ended the first part of the season with 11-0, having defeated every opponent in the league.

Players

Squad information

Players with multiple nationalities
   Michael Ojo
   Joe Ragland
   K. C. Rivers

Depth chart

On loan

Players In

Source: ABA League

Players Out

Notes:
 1 On loan during the 2018–19 ABA season.

Club

Technical Staff 

Source: Crvena zvezda Staff

Technical Staff changes

Kit

Supplier: Nike
Main sponsor: mts
Left shoulder sponsor: Mitsubishi Motors

Back sponsor: Idea (top), Komercijalna banka (bottom)
Shorts sponsor: AIK Banka

Pre-season and friendlies

Competitions

Overall

Overview

Adriatic League

Regular season

Results by round

Matches

Playoffs

EuroCup

Regular season: Group A

Regular season results by round

Regular season matches

Top 16: Group G

Top 16 results by round

Top 16 matches

Serbian Super League

The 2018–19 Basketball League of Serbia was the 13th season of the Serbian highest professional basketball league and the Super League, as the second part of the season, and was held from April 27 to June 17, 2019.

Regular season

Results by round

Matches

Playoffs

Radivoj Korać Cup

The 2019 Radivoj Korać Cup was 13th season of the Serbian cup tournament and was held within February 2019.

Adriatic Supercup

Individual awards

Adriatic League 
MVP of the Round

Ideal Starting Five

Finals MVP

Super Cup MVP

Serbian League 
Finals MVP

Statistics

Adriatic League

EuroCup

Serbian Super League

Radivoj Korać Cup

ABA Super Cup

See also 
 2018–19 Red Star Belgrade season
 2018–19 KK Partizan season

References

External links
 KK Crvena zvezda official website
 Crvena zvezda on Adriatic League 
 Crvena zvezda on EuroCup

KK Crvena Zvezda seasons
2018–19 in Serbian basketball by club
Crvena zvezda
Crvena zvezda